Public school may refer to:

State school (known as a public school in many countries), a no-fee school, publicly funded and operated by the government
Public school (United Kingdom), certain elite fee-charging independent schools in England and Wales
Great Public Schools, independent non-government fee-charging (mainly boys') elite schools in New South Wales, Australia originally established on the basis of Christian denominations 
Public Schools Association, a group of seven independent boys' schools in Perth, Western Australia
Associated Public Schools of Victoria, a group of eleven elite schools in Victoria, Australia
Public school (India), a group of historically elite fee-charging privately owned and managed schools in India

See also

 Public university, in many countries the designation for any university operated by the government as opposed to a privately owned organization